Neural is a print magazine established in 1993 dealing with new media art, electronic music and hacktivism. It was founded by Alessandro Ludovico and Minus Habens Records label owner Ivan Iusco in Bari (Italy). In its first issue (distributed in November 1993) there was the only translation in Italian of William Gibson's Agrippa (A Book of the Dead).

History
The first topics covered were: cyberpunk (both as a literally and political movement), electronic music, networks and BBS, virtual reality, media, science fiction and UFO. The magazine's mission was to be a magazine of ideas, becoming a node in a larger network of digital culture publishers. The magazine was also committed to give its topics a proper visual frame: focusing on graphic design and how it could have expressed the electronic culture in a sort of printed 'interface', exploiting at the same time the "sensorial" possibilities of the printed page. So, for example the page numbering was strictly in binary numbers for three years, then decimal figures were added aside. There was a department with stereogram pictures and the centerfold hosted a few optical art artworks. The graphic design included a fixed space in every article for contact and links, being inspired by the Whole Earth Catalog experiments.

In issue #18 the centerfold was dedicated to a hacktivist fake. It was made by fake stickers, created by the Italian hacker laboratories' network. These fake stickers were sarcastically simulating the real ones that are mandatory stuck on any book or compact disc sold in Italy, because of the law supporting the SIAE, the local Authors' and Musicians' Society. On the one published on Neural is written 'suggested duplication on any media'.

In 1997 the first Neural website was established, and it has been updated daily since September 2000. The Neural website is bi-lingual (English and Italian).

In 1998, the topics were restricted to three: media art, with a peculiar attention to the networked and conceptual use of technology in art (the so-called net.art), hacktivism, or activism using electronic media to express itself and electronic music, investigating how the technology is involved in music production, consumption and experimentation.

In May 2002, Neural was one of the founding members of Mag.net, electronic cultural publishers, an international network of magazines, whose slogan is "Collaboration is Better than Competition". This network was founded during the conference and workshop "Post Media Publishing" that took place at the Universidad International de Andalucia, in Seville (Spain). Since then, a few Mag.net meetings, mutual workshops and presentations were done in various countries, and three Mag.net Readers were published as well.

In 2007, Neural was part of the Documenta 12 magazines project  and Alessandro Ludovico was appointed as an.

In 2008, Neural celebrated 15 years of publishing with a join micro-printed action with Swamp group.

Neural magazine started as a bi-monthly but since 1997 it was printed three times in a year (some years it was printed irregularly). It was printed originally in Italian, but since 2003 there were two different printed editions: in English and Italian. The Italian printed edition was discontinued in 2008.

English Edition

Issue #20, Hacktive Community
Issue #21, Breaking the Rules
Issue #22, Facing Reality
Issue #23, Hacking the Air
Issue #24, Geek Girls
Issue #25, Media Interventionists
Issue #26, Disturbing the System
Issue #27, Copyright Guerrilla
Issue #28, Data Error
Issue #29, Digital China
Issue #30, Dangerous Games
Issue #31, Information Value
Issue #32, Machine Affection
Issue #33, Scripting Green
Issue #34, Fake'ology
Issue #35, Friends?
Issue #36, Time Deceptions
Issue #37, Common Spacing
Issue #38, p2p > f2f
Issue #39, Multiplied Identities
Issue #40, The Generative Unexpected
Issue #41, Addiction(s)
Issue #42, The Illegal Issue
Issue #43, Networked Tangibility
Issue #44, Post-Digital Printing
Issue #45, Américas!
Issue #46, Unearthed: The 20th Anniversary Issue
Issue #47, Art in the age of neurological reproduction
Issue #48, Uncanny Abundance
Issue #49, Off-Western
Issue #50, Transient Gestures
Issue #51, Revive
Issue #52, Complexity issue(s)
Issue #53, Obfuscate or Die
Issue #54, Making it up
Issue #55, Inconvenient Utopias
Issue #56, Intelligently Weak
Issue #57, Propaganda Mon Amour
Issue #58, Archivism (the dynamics of archiving)
Issue #59, Pimping the Eye, VR now
Issue #60, Blockchain. The Trust Catalyst.
Issue #61, Speculative Pink
Issue #62, Spiked Pieces, Celebrating 25 years of Neural
Issue #63, Surveillance Surveyed
Issue #64, Post-Growth
Issue #65, Redirecting Networks
Issue #66, State of Emergency
Issue #67, Adversarial Tactics

Italian Edition

N. 1, Agrippa
N. 2, Dream Machine
N. 3, Realtà Virtuali e Guerra
N. 1 nuova serie, Bruce Sterling
N. 2 nuova serie, Brain Machines
N. 3 nuova serie, Videogames
N. 4 nuova serie, Wired
N. 5 nuova serie, Intrusioni Cerebrali
N. 6 nuova serie, BBS copyright non è reato
N. 10, Telefoni cellulari, i danni biologici
N. 11, William Gibson
N. 12, Next World Radio
N. 13, Dead Media
N. 14, Scanner
N. 15, Lassigue Bendthaus
N. 16, Etoy
N. 17, RTMark
N. 18, Marcus Novak
N. 19, Richard Stallman
N. 20, Hacktive Community
N. 21, Breaking the Rules
N. 22, Facing Reality
N. 23, Hacking the Air
N. 24, Media Interventionists
N. 25, Copyright Guerrilla

Awards
Prix Ars Electronica has been awarded since 1987 by Ars Electronica, based in Linz, Austria, acknowledging excellent international initiatives and achievements in electronic and interactive art, computer animation, digital culture and music.

From 2001 to 2006, awards were given in the Net Vision / Net Excellence category. In 2004, Neural received an honorary mention in this category.

Contributors
Contributors who wrote on Neural:

Josephine Bosma, Jonah Brucker Cohen, Bronac Ferran, Daphne Dragona, Paul Prudence, Vittore Baroni, Francesca Bianchi, Aldo Chimenti, Cosma Di Tanno, Francesco Lodolo, Antonio Scacco, Paul Toohill, Fabrizio Usberti, Luca Valtorta, Maurizio Verga, Francesco Zappalà

Further reading

References

External links
 official website
 official website in Italian
 We Make Money, Not Art: Interview with Alessandro Ludovico
 Interview with Alessandro Ludovico (Neural.it)

1993 establishments in Italy
Contemporary art magazines
Irregularly published magazines
Magazines published in Italy
Bi-monthly magazines published in Italy
Italian-language magazines
Magazines established in 1993
Mass media in Bari
Triannual magazines